Happy Valley station, is a station on Line 7 of the Beijing Subway.

Station layout 
The station has an underground island platform.

Exits 
There are 2 exits, lettered B and C. Exit C is accessible.

See also
Happy Valley Beijing

References

Railway stations in China opened in 2014
Beijing Subway stations in Chaoyang District